Clostridium arcticum is a species of bacteria belonging to the family Clostridiaceae.

References

arcticum